April is the fourth month of the year.

April might also refer to:

People and fictional characters 
 April (given name)
 April (surname)

Films
 April (1961 film), a film by Georgian Otar Ioseliani
 April (1998 film), a film by Nanni Moretti

Music 
April (girl group), a South Korean girl band founded in 2015
April (Finnish band), founded in 2004
April (British band), a British girl group produced by Les Burgess and Tony Hatch 1975–1977
April Records, a Dutch record label
Schneeball (record label) or April, a German record label

Albums
 April (VAST album), 2007
 April (Sun Kil Moon album), 2008

Songs
 "April", a 1969 song by Deep Purple from Deep Purple (album)
 "April", a 2019 song by Caravan Palace from Chronologic

Classical music
 "April: Snowdrop", a piece for piano solo in The Seasons (Tchaikovsky) (1876)
 "April", one of the Two Pieces for Piano (1925) by John Ireland

Other
 APRIL (protein), a tumor necrosis factor recognized by the TACI receptor 
 April (French association), an association for the promotion of free software in the French-speaking world
 April (giraffe) (2002–2021), a captive reticulated giraffe
 April (tapir), the oldest living captive tapir
 Asia Pacific Resources International Holdings, developer of fibre plantations and owner of one of the world's largest pulp and paper mills

See also

 
 Avril (disambiguation)